"Charlotte" is a song by the Canadian heavy metal band Kittie, released as the second single from their debut album Spit. The song was inspired by a book about a serial killer that Kittie member Morgan Lander read called Rites of Burial by Tom Jackman and Troy Cole. A music video for the song, which follows an angel who has crashed down and lost his wings, was shot in Toronto and directed by Lisa Rubisch. The music video for "Charlotte" also got played very frequently on MTV. Released in the year 2000, the single for "Charlotte" went to number 60 on the UK Singles Chart.

Release and commercial performance
"Charlotte" was released a single by Kittie on June 5, 2000. The song went to number 60 on the UK Singles Chart.

Background

"Charlotte" was inspired by a book that Kittie member Morgan Lander read. The book, Rites of Burial by Tom Jackman and Troy Cole, was about a serial killer named Robert Berdella. In an interview with Songfacts.com, Lander said about the serial killer: "He did a lot of really, really messed up things, and the story really stuck with me. I thought it was really quite sad and disturbing. So, it draws lyrical inspiration from that."

Music video
The music video for "Charlotte" was shot in Toronto and directed by Lisa Rubisch. Kittie told MTV News that the band was shooting for something with more of a concept than the "Brackish" music video, but with a performance of the band still being a strong element. The music video, which got played very frequently on MTV, follows an angel who has crashed down and lost his wings.

Track list
 "Charlotte - Alternate Mellow Version"
 "Suck - Live"
 "Spit - Live"
 "Charlotte - Alge Remix Radio Edit"

Charts

Release history

References

2000 singles
2000 songs
Works about serial killers
Kittie songs